Dominique Roman (April 16, 1824 in Arles – 1911, in Arles) was a French photographer.

1824 births
1911 deaths
19th-century French photographers
People from Arles
Pioneers of photography